Caroline Collins is a news anchor for KRIV-TV in Houston, Texas. She gained attention for her Social Media posts during her time at KSEE-TV in Fresno, California. She also co-hosted a nationally televised golf instructional show series, The Swing Clinic, which aired on Fox Sports and Collins was the face of national golf companies modeling for Golf Galaxy and Dick’s Sporting Goods.
 She also completed for Miss Pennsylvania.

Early Life and College
Collins grew up in West Middlesex, Pennsylvania, she attended Kennedy Catholic High School (Hermitage, Pennsylvania) and Point Park University in Pittsburgh, Pennsylvania on a full-ride athletic scholarship. She was on the PPU women’s golf team where she won several events and made two holes-in-one within two weeks of one another and was All-Conference in her senior year. She would get a Bachelors in broadcasting and later a Master of Arts in communication technology, with a concentration in social media, both at PPU.

Career
She launched her career in broadcasting at WJET–WFXP in Erie, Pennsylvania, where she was a general assignment reporter, fill-in anchor and producer then going to WFMJ-TV in Youngstown, Ohio, where she was a weekend evening anchor and multi-media journalist as well as co-hosting The Swing Clinic. It was her time in Fresno where she was the morning anchor when gained a following on TikTok and Instagram. She has over 1.3 million followers and 26 million likes on TikTok and over 320 thousand followers on Instagram. 
While at KSEE in Fresno, California, also did a story for NBC's Today (American TV program) as a part of Today's “Spookiest House in America” segment. She made her debut for KRIV in 2023.

References

External links 

Living people
American television reporters and correspondents
American women television journalists
21st-century American women
Point Park University alumni
Year of birth missing (living people)
Television anchors from Houston